Nærøysund Lighthouse is a coastal lighthouse in the municipality of Nærøysund in Trøndelag, Norway. This lighthouse replaced the Prestøy Lighthouse in Nærøy (across the Nærøysundet strait) that was in operation from 1841 until 1904. This lighthouse was operational from 1904 until 1984, when the old lighthouse was decommissioned and a new automated light tower was built adjacent to the building.

Nærøysund lighthouse stands on the eastern shore of the island of Inner-Vikna, just south of Rørvik, along the Nærøysundet strait. The occulting light has a 6-second cycle, emitting a 26,100-candela light.

See also

Lighthouses in Norway
List of lighthouses in Norway

References

External links
 Norsk Fyrhistorisk Forening 
 Picture of Nærøysund Lighthouse

Lighthouses completed in 1904
Lighthouses in Trøndelag
Nærøysund
Vikna